Edwin Smith House may refer to:
 Edwin Smith House (Wellington, Kansas), listed on the National Register of Historic Places in Sumner County, Kansas
 Edwin Smith House (Dayton, Ohio), listed on the NRHP in Ohio
Edwin A. Smith House, Spokane, Washington, listed on the NRHP in Spokane County, Washington

See also
Smith House (disambiguation)